Mario Cossa (died 1618) was a Roman Catholic prelate who served as Bishop of Montalcino (1607–1618).

Biography
Mario Cossa was born in Siena, Italy.
On 2 Apr 1607, he was appointed during the papacy of Pope Paul V as Bishop of Montalcino.
On 29 Apr 1607, he was consecrated bishop by Roberto Francesco Romolo Bellarmino, Cardinal-Priest of San Matteo in Merulana, with Antonio Caetani (iuniore), Archbishop of Capua, and Metello Bichi, Bishop Emeritus of Sovana, serving as co-consecrators. 
He served as Bishop of Montalcino until his death in 1618.

References

External links and additional sources
 (for Chronology of Bishops) 
 (for Chronology of Bishops) 

17th-century Italian Roman Catholic bishops
Bishops appointed by Pope Paul V
People from Siena
1618 deaths